Seth Lewis Plum (15 July 1899 – 29 November 1969) was an English international footballer who played as a wing half.

Club career
Born in Edmonton, Plum played professionally for Charlton Athletic, Chelsea and Southend United.

Chelsea
The 1925–26 season was to be Plum's final season for Chelsea, ending in him featuring on nine occasions, all of which came in March and April 1926. Despite his position as a wing half, Plum left Stamford Bridge having scored no goals in 27 appearances for the club.

Southend United
On 1 July 1927, Plum joined Southend United, who were then playing in the Third Division (South). He started all of his 10 games for the Seasiders before retiring through injury at the age of 28.

International career
Plum received his only cap for England at age 23 while playing for Charlton Athletic, starting and playing the full 90 minutes in a 4–1 win over France on 10 May 1923.

Later life
In the early 1960s, Plum worked as a petrol pump attendant at a garage in Tottenham.

References

1899 births
1969 deaths
English footballers
England international footballers
Charlton Athletic F.C. players
Chelsea F.C. players
Southend United F.C. players
English Football League players
Association football wing halves